Herbert C. Conaway Jr. (born January 30, 1963) is an American Democratic Party politician, who has served in the New Jersey General Assembly since 1998, where he represents the 7th Legislative District.

Conaway served in the Assembly as the Majority Whip from 2014 to 2017, and was the Deputy Speaker from 2002 to 2005 and again starting in 2022.

Early life 
Conaway was born at St. Francis Medical Center in Trenton on January 30, 1963, to Eva Christine Conaway (née Godard), a nurse at the hospital, and Herb Conaway Sr., a history teacher at Bordentown Regional High School. He grew up in Bordentown, attending high school there. Conaway graduated with an A.B. in politics from Princeton University in 1985 after completing a 67-page long senior thesis titled "Black Political Strategy." He then received an M.D. degree from Jefferson Medical College at Thomas Jefferson University and was awarded a J.D. from Rutgers School of Law—Newark. He is the only member of the legislature to hold both an M.D. degree and a J.D. degree. Conaway later served in the United States Air Force Medical Corps from 1992 to 1996, reaching the rank of Captain. He served at McGuire Air Force Base in Burlington County as general medical officer and as assistant director of the primary care clinic. He continues to practice medicine whilst serving in the legislature. He specializes in internal medicine and currently serves as director of the internal medicine clinic at St. Francis Medical Center in Trenton. He formerly worked at Cooper University Hospital and had a practice in Willingboro. Formerly a resident of Delanco Township, he now lives in Moorestown.

New Jersey Assembly 
Conaway was first elected to the General Assembly from the 7th District in 1997 as the top vote getter. The same election saw his running mate and second-place finisher, Jack Conners, be seated then removed due to voting machine issues and replaced in September 1998 by Republican Kenneth William Faulkner. Conners was subsequently elected in a 1998 special election and the two served together from the 7th district from that point until 2011 when Conners resigned. Since late 2011, his Assembly associate from the district was Troy Singleton, until Singleton was elected to the New Jersey Senate. Since 2018, his Assembly associate has been Carol A. Murphy. He served as the Assembly's Deputy Speaker from 2002 to 2005.

Calling the proposed bill a "recipe for disaster" that could result in the spread of disease, Conaway opposed legislation proposed by Assemblywoman Charlotte Vandervalk that would give parents the right to exclude their children from mandatory vaccinations, after hearings held in March 2011 by the Assembly Health and Senior Services Committee. In 2019, Conaway supported legislation eliminating religious exemptions from mandatory vaccination requirements for students to be eligible to attend school.

Committee assignments 
Committee assignments for the current session are:
Health, Chair
Budget
Military and Veterans' Affairs

District 7 
Each of the 40 districts in the New Jersey Legislature has one representative in the New Jersey Senate and two members in the New Jersey General Assembly. The representatives from the 7th District for the 2022—23 Legislative Session are:
Senator Troy Singleton (D)
Assemblyman Herb Conaway (D)
Assemblywoman Carol A. Murphy (D)

Campaign for the United States House of Representatives 
Conaway ran for the United States House of Representatives for New Jersey's 3rd congressional district in the 2004 election, losing to Republican Jim Saxton

Electoral history

Assembly

References

External links
Assemblyman Conaway's legislative web page, New Jersey Legislature
New Jersey Legislature financial disclosure forms
2018 2017 2016 2015 2014 2013 2012 2011 2010 2009 2008 2007 2006 2005 2004
Assemblyman Herb Conaway website
Assembly Member Herbert C. 'Herb' Conaway Jr., Project Vote Smart
New Jersey Voter Information Website 2003

1963 births
Living people
Bordentown Regional High School alumni
Democratic Party members of the New Jersey General Assembly
New Jersey lawyers
Physicians from New Jersey
People from Bordentown, New Jersey
People from Delanco Township, New Jersey
People from Moorestown, New Jersey
Politicians from Burlington County, New Jersey
Politicians from Trenton, New Jersey
Princeton University alumni
Rutgers School of Law–Newark alumni
Thomas Jefferson University alumni
United States Air Force officers
African-American state legislators in New Jersey
21st-century American politicians
21st-century African-American politicians
20th-century African-American people
Military personnel from New Jersey